Winfield is an unincorporated community in Columbia County, in the U.S. state of Georgia.

History
A post office called Winfield was established in 1851, and remained in operation until 1918. It is unclear why the name "Winfield" was applied to this community. A variant name is "Sharon Church".

Near Winfield stands Woodville, an antebellum plantation mansion which was listed on the National Register of Historic Places in 1979.

References

Unincorporated communities in Georgia (U.S. state)
Unincorporated communities in Columbia County, Georgia